Slightly Latin is an album by the jazz multi-instrumentalist Roland Kirk, released on the Limelight label in 1965. It includes performances by Kirk with Virgil Jones, Martin Banks, Garnett Brown, Horace Parlan, Eddie Mathias, Sonny Brown, Montego Joe, Manuel Ramos, Coleridge Perkinson and an unidentified choir.

Track listing
All compositions by Roland Kirk except as indicated.
 "Walk On By" (Burt Bacharach, Hal David) -  2:32  
 "Raouf" - 3:03  
 "It's All in the Game" (Charles Dawes, Carl Sigman) - 5:14  
 "Juarez" - 5:22  
 "Shaky Money" - 2:36  
 "Nothing But the Truth" - 3:33  
 "Safari" (Eddie Mathias) - 4:26  
 "And I Love Her" (John Lennon, Paul McCartney) - 2:53  
 "Ebrauqs" - 8:16
Recorded in New York City on November 16 & 17, 1965

Personnel
Roland Kirk: tenor saxophone, manzello, stritch, clarinet, flute, bagpipes, piccolo, baritone saxophone, siren
Virgil Jones: trumpet
Martin Banks: flugelhorn
Garnett Brown: trombone, arranger
Horace Parlan: piano, celeste, vibraphone
Eddie Mathias: double bass
Sonny Brown: drums, nagoya harp
Montego Joe: conga
Manuel Ramos: percussion
Coleridge Perkinson: conductor (tracks 2, 4 & 6)
Unidentified choir (tracks 2, 4 & 6)

References

1965 albums
Limelight Records albums
Rahsaan Roland Kirk albums
Albums produced by Hal Mooney